Giovanni Antonio Cucchi (Campiglia Cervo, active 1750) was an Italian painter.

Biography
He was active in painting for the Sacro Monte di Varallo. He also painted for the Palazzo Brentano in Corbetta, alongside Giovanni Battista Sassi.

References

Year of birth missing
Year of death missing
18th-century Italian painters
Italian male painters
Painters from Milan
Campiglia Cervo
18th-century Italian male artists